Joshua James Bohannon (born 9 April 1997) is an English cricketer who plays for Lancashire County Cricket Club.

Career

Bohannon made his List A debut for Lancashire in the 2018 Royal London One-Day Cup on 25 May 2018. He made his Twenty20 debut for Lancashire in the 2018 t20 Blast on 3 August 2018. He made his first-class debut for Lancashire in the 2018 County Championship on 17 August 2018.

In April 2022, in the 2022 County Championship, Bohannon scored his maiden double century in first-class cricket, with 231 against Gloucestershire.

In August 2022, he was discussed as a candidate for a test debut in the England cricket team.

Role
Bohannon is a right handed top order batter who also bowls at medium pace.

References

External links
 

1997 births
Living people
English cricketers
Lancashire cricketers
Cricketers from Bolton